Casuarina Prison is the main maximum-security prison for Western Australia, located in the Perth, Western Australia suburb of Casuarina. The prison accommodates minimum-, medium- and maximum-security prisoners. It was opened in 1991 to replace Fremantle Prison, which was 130 years old. The prison was the scene of a riot on Christmas Day 1998. The prison featured in the documentary Australia's Hardest Prison: Lockdown Oz on the National Geographic channel in 2008, following the lives of prisoners and officers.

In 2013 the prison was the setting for the film Son of a Gun.

The prison has been subject of multiple legal actions due to alleged "inhumane conditions". In 2022, seventeen teenagers were relocated to the maximum security prison prompting a class action. The Department of Justice has defended its actions, while victim advocates have raised concerns around the law firm representing the youth. 

The Australian Human Rights Commission has raised concerns about the issue of teenagers being held at the prison, prompting calls for further action.

Notable prisoners
 Jack Roche
 Dante Arthurs
 David Birnie (1951–2005)
 Robert Bropho (1930–2011)
 Terence Kelly, alleged kidnapper of Cleo Smith
 Bradley Edwards Claremont Serial Killer

References

External links
Casuarina Prison – Department of Corrective Services
 Report of an Unannounced Inspection of the IOU and the SHU at Casuarina Prison (2000) (pdf)
 Report of a Follow-up Inspection of the Special Management Units at Casuarina Prison (2001) (pdf)

1991 establishments in Australia
Prisons in Western Australia
Maximum security prisons in Australia